Semikarakorsky District is an administrative and municipal district (raion), one of the forty-three in Rostov Oblast, Russia. It is located in the center of the oblast. Its administrative center is the town of Semikarakorsk. Population: 52,833 (2010 Census);  The population of Semikarakorsk accounts for 45.2% of the district's total population.

References

Notes

Sources

Districts of Rostov Oblast